Zaharya Efendi Mir Cemil (died 1740) was a composer of Turkish classical music. He was of Greek origin. Zaharya was said to have served as head cantor at the Greek Orthodox Patriarchate in Fener.

Compositions

Notes

External links

1740 deaths
Composers from the Ottoman Empire
Composers of Ottoman classical music
Composers of Turkish makam music